Major-General Johann Heinrich Karl von Bernewitz, styled John de Bernewitz when in British service, (27 December 1760 – 13 December 1821) was a British Army officer who served as General Officer Commanding the 7th Division during the Peninsular War.

Military career
De Bernewitz was commissioned into the Army of the Electorate of Brunswick-Lüneburg in 1775. He refused to join the 
Army of the Kingdom of Westphalia when Brunswick-Lüneburg was annexed by Westphalia in 1807. He then commanded the forces of Brunswick-Lüneburg during the rebellion by Frederick William, Duke of Brunswick-Wolfenbüttel in 1809. He served under British command during the Peninsular War and commanded a British brigade at the Battle of Salamanca on 22 July 1812. He also briefly served as General Officer Commanding the 7th Division in Spain from 23 September 1812 to 25 October 1812.

References

1760 births
1821 deaths
British Army major generals